Newlyweds: Nick and Jessica is an American reality television series that aired on MTV. It followed the marriage of then husband and wife Nick Lachey and Jessica Simpson. The show premiered on August 19, 2003, and ran for three seasons, with 41 episodes in total. The last season started on January 26, 2005, and the show concluded on March 30, 2005.

Simpson and Lachey were married on October 26, 2002, and filed for divorce on December 16, 2005. On June 30, 2006, Jessica and Nick's divorce was finalized.

Part of the show's gimmick involved displaying Simpson's naive personality, playing on the popular stereotype of "dumb blondes". Perhaps the most famous example comes from the first episode, in which Simpson, confronted with a can of Chicken of the Sea tuna, asked Nick "Is this chicken, what I have, or is this fish? I know it's tuna, but it says 'Chicken... by the Sea' [sic]."

Origin

The show was originally intended for Michael Jackson and Lisa Marie Presley after their marriage in 1994, but the couple decided not to continue with the project after the start of pre-production.  It was shelved until 2002, when Jessica's father and manager, Joe Simpson, contacted Marty about producing a show starring his daughter and  her new husband.

When Simpson was originally asked why she chose to do such a show for MTV, she replied that it was good promotion for her new album In This Skin. The reality show, which coincided with the release of the album, at first did not help Simpson's album sales, as it debuted at #10 on the Billboard charts and quickly fell down. Constantine Paraskevopoulos was asked to come in and direct "Sweetest Sin" and help sculpt an image breakthrough for the couple depicting them in a way that would break the boundaries of her conservative church going base. The video helped raise an overall awareness and sex appeal for both Jessica and Nick, and was strongly featured in season one's top episode "the Video shoot". During this time, Constantine was also asked to direct Nick Lachey's video "Shut Up", featuring Dax Shepard from Punk'd. This was also highlighted on the series.

However, over the span of the first season, Simpson's popularity began growing, as many of her "dumb blonde" antics gave her much publicity. By the close of 2003, Simpson and Lachey had both become household names, and Newlyweds had become a pop culture phenomenon. Simpson's label decided to release the second single "With You" to see how it would do on radio now that Simpson had become an A-Lister.

Episode list

Season 1

Season 2

Season 2.5

Specials

Season 3

References

External links

 
 

2003 American television series debuts
2005 American television series endings
2000s American reality television series
American dating and relationship reality television series
English-language television shows
MTV reality television series
Jessica Simpson
Nick Lachey